ACPM could mean
 American College of Preventive Medicine,a professional society for physicians
 ACPM Medical College, a medical school in India
 Associated Portland Cement Manufacturers Ltd, a British company later renamed Blue Circle Industries